Yamchi District is in Marand County, East Azerbaijan province, Iran. At the 2006 National Census, its population was 27,468 in 6,728 households. The following census in 2011 counted 27,509 people in 8,007 households. At the latest census in 2016, the district had 27,877 inhabitants in 8,679 households.

References 

Marand County

Districts of East Azerbaijan Province

Populated places in East Azerbaijan Province

Populated places in Marand County